Mohamed Rasheed (born 15 April 1985) is a Maldivian footballer, nicknamed "Hokey", who is currently playing for New Radiant SC.

International career
Mohamed made his debut in a friendly match against Thailand on February 24, 2012.

2012 AFC Challenge Cup
He played all the matches in the 2012 AFC Challenge Cup for the Maldives. He used to play as a left back at the club level, but the coach István Urbányi used him as a left wing forward. As a result, he scored his first goal for the Red Snappers in the 1–0 win against Nepal on March 10, 2012.

Career statistics

International goals

Senior team

Awards and honours

Club
Victory
President's Cup: 2011

References

External links 
 
 Mohamed Rasheed on Maldivesoccer (link 2)
 Hokey sins to Valencia
  Mohamed Rasheed (Mohamed) (2011)
  Mohamed Rasheed (Mohamed) (2012)
  Mohamed Rasheed (2013)
  Mohamed Rasheed (2015)
  Mohamed Rasheed (2016)

1985 births
Living people
Maldivian footballers
Maldives international footballers
Victory Sports Club players
Club Valencia players
Maziya S&RC players
New Radiant S.C. players
Association football wingers
Association football fullbacks
Super United Sports players
Da Grande Sports Club players